Karlheinz Guttmacher (born 24 August 1942) was a German politician of the Free Democratic Party (FDP) and former member of the German Bundestag.

Life 
Via the Landesliste Thüringen Guttmacher entered the German Bundestag in 1990 and was a member of parliament until 2005. In the 15th legislative period he was chairman of the Petitions Committee from February 2004.

Literature

References

1942 births
Members of the Bundestag for Thuringia
Members of the Bundestag 2002–2005
Members of the Bundestag 1998–2002
Members of the Bundestag 1994–1998
Members of the Bundestag 1990–1994
Members of the Bundestag for the Free Democratic Party (Germany)
Living people